The UK Singles Chart is the official chart for the United Kingdom of singles. The chart is compiled by The Official Chart Company and the beginning of an "official" singles chart is generally regarded as February 1969 when the British Market Research Bureau (BMRB) was formed to compile the chart in a joint venture between the BBC and Record Retailer. Charts were used to measure the popularity of music and, initially, were based on sheet music. In 1952, NME imitated an American idea from Billboard magazine and began compiling a chart based on physical sales of the release. Rival publications such as Record Mirror, Melody Maker and Disc began to compile their own charts in the mid-to-late 1950s. Trade paper Record Retailer compiled their first chart in March 1960.

No single chart was universally followed during this period. Retrospectively, the Guinness Book of British Hit Singles and The Official Chart Company have chosen canonical sources for the era: NME (November 1952 – March 1960) and Record Retailer (March 1960 – February 1969). These choices have not been universally welcomed, particularly that of Record Retailer during the 1960s, when charts like NME had a significantly wider circulation and following. The BBC's Pick of the Pops circumvented the lack of an official chart by aggregating the aforementioned publications to create their own chart.

Notable omissions from the canon are The Rolling Stones' "19th Nervous Breakdown" and The Beatles' "Please Please Me" which both reached number one on the NME, Disc, and Melody Maker charts, topped the BBC's Pick of the Pops aggregated chart and - in the case of "19th Nervous Breakdown" - was  announced as number one on Top of the Pops; however, in failing to top the Record Retailer chart, they are not generally regarded as number-one singles.

Main charts

New Musical Express (NME)

The New Musical Express (NME) chart was the first in the United Kingdom to gauge the popularity of recorded music by sales; previously, sheet music sales charts had been compiled. NMEs co-founder Percy Dickins imitated the chart produced by American Billboard magazine and began to compile Britain's first hit parade in 1952. For the first chart, Dickins telephoned a sample of around 20 shops asking for a list of the 10 best-selling songs. These results were then aggregated to give a Top 12 chart (with 15 entries due to tied positions) that was published in NME on 14 November 1952. Other periodicals produced their own charts and The Official Charts Company and Guinness' British Hit Singles & Albums regard NME as the canonical British singles chart until 10 March 1960. After this Record Retailer is regarded as the canonical source until February 1969, when the British Market Research Bureau (BMRB) was formed. However, during the 1960s NME had the biggest circulation of charts in the decade and was the most widely followed.

After 1969, NME continued to compile charts in the 1970s and 1980s and ended its time as the longest running independently compiled in May 1988.

Record Mirror

Record Mirror compiled its own record chart from 1955 until 1962 which was used by many national newspapers. It formed as the first rival to the existing chart published by NME. The Mirrors chart was based on the postal returns from record stores that were financed by the newspaper—rival chart, NME, was based on a telephone poll. Its first chart was a Top 10 published on 22 January 1955 using figures from 24 shops. The chart was expanded from a Top 10 to a Top 20 on 8 October 1955. In the early 1960s some national newspapers switched to using a chart compiled by Melody Maker and, ultimately, the cost of collecting sales figures by post led to the chart's demise. On 24 March 1962, the paper stopped compiling its own chart and started publishing Record Retailers Top 50.

Melody Maker

Melody Maker compiled its own chart from 1956 until 1988 which was used by many national newspapers. It was the third periodical to compile a chart and rivaled existing compilers NME and Record Mirror. Melody Makers chart, like NMEs, was based on a telephone poll of record stores. Melody Maker compiled a Top 20 for its first chart using figures from 19 shops on 7 April 1956. During the 1950s, sample sizes ranged from around 14–33 shops and on 30 July 1960 the phoning of record shops was supplemented with postal returns; the first chart to use this method sampled 38 stores from 110 returns. On 26 August 1967, Disc, owned by the same company as Melody Maker, stopped compiling their own chart and started using the Melody Maker chart. In its 9 February 1963 edition, Melody Maker disclosed that it received chart returns from 245 retailers and that its chart was audited by auditors supplied by Middlesex County Council.

Disc & Music Echo

Disc compiled its own chart from 1958 until 1967, the Disc which was used by many national newspapers. It formed as a rival to the existing charts published by NME, Record Mirror, and Melody Maker. Discs chart, like two of its rivals, was based on a telephone poll of record stores. On 1 February 1958 Disc compiled its first chart which was a Top 20 using figures from 20 shops. Throughout the 1950s Discs sample sizes remained below 40 shops and in the early 1960s the sample size was increased to approximately 50 and compiled by Fred Zebadee; other rival charts had increased their samples to around 100 but this was too expensive for Disc. On 23 April 1966 the publication Mersey Beat (which ran its own chart) was incorporated into Disc which became Disc and Music Echo. On 26 August 1967, Disc, who was then owned by the same company as Melody Maker, stopped compiling their own chart and started using the Melody Maker chart.

Record Retailer

Record Retailer was a trade paper that began compiling a record chart in March 1960. Although prior to 1969 there was no official singles chart, Record Retailer is considered by The Official Charts Company to be the canonical source from 10 March 1960 until 15 February 1969 when Retailer and the BBC jointly commissioned the BMRB to compile the charts. The choice to use Record Retailer as the canonical source for the 1960s has been contentious because NME had the biggest circulation of periodicals in the decade and was more widely followed. One source explains that the reason for using the Record Retailer chart for the 1960s was that it was "the only chart to have as many as 50 positions for almost the entire decade". The sample size of Record Retailer in the early 1960s was around 30 stores whereas NME and Melody Maker were sampling over 100 stores. In 1969, the first BMRB chart was compiled using postal returns of sales logs from 250 record shops.

Other charts

BBC's Pick of the Pops
The BBC first aired Pick of the Pops on its Light Programme radio station on 4 October 1955. Initially airing popular songs, it developed an aggregated chart from March 1958. Using the NME, Melody Maker, Disc and Record Mirror charts the BBC cumulated them by totalling points gained in the four charts (1 point for a number one, 2 for a number two, etc.) to give a form of chart average – however, this method was prone to tied positions. Record Retailer was included in the average from 31 March 1962 after Record Mirror had ceased compiling their chart.

Radio Luxembourg
In the 1930s, Radio Luxembourg pioneered the United States style of commercial broadcasting in Britain. During the World War II the station broadcast Nazi propaganda and was then used United States troops until September 1946 with English-sponsored programming resuming at the end of the year. In 1946, the Music Publishers' Association began compiling sheet music popularity charts and in 1948 British radio listeners heard their first chart show based on sales of sheet music with Radio Luxembourg broadcasting them during a Top Twenty programme on Sunday evenings.

When programme administrator Derek Johnson heard about NMEs chart in the 1950s, he passed them on to disc jockeys at Radio Luxembourg who aired a chart rundown each night. The NME chart was used by Radio Luxembourg from January 1960 to 1967 and is said to have given "the chart acceptance and credence".

Big L's Fab 40

Wonderful Radio London, also known as Big L, was a pirate radio station that operated from the MV Galaxy of the coast of Essex. Founded and financially backed by American Don Pierson the station introduced contemporary hit radio, popular in the United States, to the UK. The Fab 40 was the weekly playlist and was broadcast each Sunday as a chart based entirely on airplay. The station closed on 14 August 1967 when the Marine Broadcasting Offences Act came into effect, Later, rivals to the official chart would factor airplay into their charts.

Mersey Beat

Mersey Beat was founded initially as a regional bi-weekly publication on 13 July 1961. In 1963 it began compiling a Top 20 chart based on around 10 stores and became a national paper. The charts and paper became weekly on 24 April 1964 and, following an investment in September 1964 by Brian Epstein, expanded the chart and sample size to become the first publication to announce a Top 100 on 3 December 1964. On 6 March 1965 the paper was rebranded Music Echo & Mersey Beat, which later that year became Music Echo, and by 16 April 1966 the chart was no longer published—the following week the newspaper was incorporated into Disc becoming Disc and Music Echo.

Top Pops

Top Pops was founded initially as a monthly publication in May 1967. In May 1968 it began compiling a chart based on the telephone sample of 12 W H Smith & Son stores. The charts and paper became weekly the following month. Rebranded Music Now by 1970, the chart and paper ceased publication the following year.

Comparison of chart number-ones (1952–1969)

The canonical sources referred to above are NME for number ones 1–97 and Record Retailer for number ones 97–265
Edit by chart considered the canonical source: NME •
Record Retailer

Notes

References
Footnotes

Sources

Lists of number-one songs in the United Kingdom
1950s in British music
1960s in British music